Anderson Hunt (born May 5, 1969) is an American former basketball player.

NCAA career
Hunt is best known as a member of the successful 1989–91 Runnin' Rebels from the University of Nevada-Las Vegas (UNLV) that made back-to-back Final Four appearances including a national championship in 1989–90 where he contributed 29 points in a 103–73 rout of the Blue Devils of Duke University and named Most Outstanding Player of the tournament by the Associated Press.
In May 1991, the Las Vegas Review-Journal published photos of Hunt with teammates David Butler and Moses Scurry in a hot tub with known sports fixer Richard Perry, igniting a monumental firestorm between coach Jerry Tarkanian, UNLV president Robert Maxon, and the NCAA.  This battle would eventually lead to Tarkanian's resignation at the end of the 1991–92 season. Hunt left school as a junior after the 1991 season to enter the NBA Draft, much to the dismay of his coach, who had hoped to convert him to point guard and make him the centerpiece of the team in the 1991–92 season.

Professional career
Despite his solid college resume, Hunt was not selected in the 1991 NBA draft. The La Crosse Catbirds selected him in the second round of that year's Continental Basketball Association draft with the 25th overall pick. In later years, Hunt ended up playing professionally in Turkey, Poland, and France.

Legal troubles
In October 1993, Hunt was arrested for marijuana possession in connection with a traffic stop and later pleaded guilty to misdemeanor charges. In 2002, he again ran into legal trouble, facing charges of attempted embezzlement after he failed to return a rental car for an extended period of time. He was ordered to pay $1,300 in restitution and placed on probation.

After basketball
After his retirement, Hunt worked at the Imperial Palace Hotel and Casino in Las Vegas. He is now with a youth basketball program sponsored by 4POINT4 Sports.

References

1969 births
Living people
African-American basketball players
American expatriate basketball people in France
American expatriate basketball people in Poland
American expatriate basketball people in Turkey
Basketball players from Detroit
Fort Wayne Fury players
Quad City Thunder players
Shooting guards
Sioux Falls Skyforce (CBA) players
UNLV Runnin' Rebels basketball players
American men's basketball players
United States Basketball League players
21st-century African-American people
20th-century African-American sportspeople